Karava Heraldry includes a large number of Karava flags that have survived the ravages of time. Many are illustrated in E. W. Perera's monumental book titled 'Sinhalese Banners and Standards'.

The Symbols

The Makara
Beknopte History, 1688 describes a white flag charged with a red flag hoisted on royal ships (JRASCB XI No.38 106 & 109). And in the words of Valentine Francois, the 18th century Dutch Historian, “the Karawas displayed a white flag with the device of a particular fish in the centre".

The Makara, is a composite dragon with a curious mythical structure. It symbolizes the house of Capricorn in the Zodiac to which it has given its name Makara in the Hindu calendar. It has the head of a crocodile, horns of a goat, the body of an antelope and a snake, the tail of a fish and feet of a panther. Makara is half animal half fish and it is sometimes described as having the head of an elephant and the body of a fish. It is generally large and regarded as living in the ocean rather than in lakes or streams.

Only Varuna, the spiritual ruler of the world has power over the Makara. It is Varuna's vehicle in Hindu mythology. The Varunakulasuriya clan is the largest of the Karava clans in southern Sri Lanka. The symbolism is extremely interesting. In mythology Varuna is the chief of the Adithyas. Remnants of the name Adithya from the medieval period can still be found in Karava family names. As Adithya is a synonym for Suriya (i.e. the Sun). the Karava clan Varunakulasuriya too signifies Varuna-Adithya.
 
The Kokila Sandesha poem from the Kotte period refers to the Makara flag as follows:
Punsanda surindu sanda salakuna adina vara
Ban sonda telitudew tele tudeni mana hara
Min dada jaya virudu nada karana piya kara
An koda mediya tura topa sarivana pavara

 

 

See Fish and ship symbols of Sri Lanka for the significance of the Fish and Ship symbols on these flags.

The Elephant
The recurrent Elephant symbol may be from the Mahabharata, Hastinapura which means Elephant city, the capital of the Kaurava kingdom. The great war of the epic Mahabharata is fought over the throne of this city and most incidents in the epic take place in this city. The Sri Lankan chronicle Rajavaliya states that the elephant flag was prominent in Mayadunne's son, prince Rajasinghe's battle at Mulleriyawa against the Portuguese.

 The tombstone of Patangatim Francisco Piris' wife from St. Thomas Church, Jinthupitiya illustrated here, shows that the Karava heraldic symbols: Pearl umbrella, Palm tree, caparisoned Elephant and Fish symbol were used even on tombstones (JRASCB XXII 387)

The White shield
The white shields known as sak paliha or conch shields were also important royal symbols in Sri Lanka's history. The Karava ancestral flag illustrated above displays two of them. The sak paliha was a white shield sometimes with the devise of a conch shell on it and is referred to frequently as a royal symbol in Sinhalese historical texts. According to the Portuguese historian De Couto, it was also used as a royal symbol ( JRASCB XX 187 ).

Usage by kin-groups in India
Across the Palk Strait, the kinsmen of the Karavas too have used similar insignia in the past. H. R. Pate describes a wedding as follows: A peculiar feature of the wedding is the procession to the bride's house with virudus or banners supposed to be the insignia of the Kingly ancestors of the race. The emblems consist of 21 flags embroidered with representations of various objects, animate and inanimate, such as a Snake, a Peacock, a Palmyra, a Chank, the Sun and Moon an Elephant. A Fish and so on. In addition to these a large Umbrella, a Shield and other trappings are carried. The bridegroom wears a costume called KAPA resembling the state robes of Jathi Thalavi More and white cloths are spread before hi in his path. (Madras District Gazetteer 123 & 124)

The Chandra Kula Maalawa
An old document called the 'Chandrakula Malawa' from the Pitigal Korale enumerates the following 21 flags as belonging to the Kurukula:
 Naga Kodiya (Cobra flag)
 Kukulu Kodiya (Cock flag)
 Monara Kodiya (Peacock flag)
 Talgaha bendi Kodiya (Talipot palm flag)
 Newa bendi Kodiya (Ship flag)
 Hakgediya bendi Kodiya (Chank flag)
 Sippiya Kodiya (Sea shell flag)
 Kotiya bendi Kodiya (Leopard flag)
 Sinhaya bendi Kodiya (Lion flag)
 Rajaliya bendi Kodiya (Eagle flag)
 Hansaya bendi Kodiya (Swan flag)
 Tanmetta bendi Kodiya (Kettle drum flag)
 Surya Kodiya (Sun flag)
 Chandrabendi Kodiya (Moon flag)
 Etha bendi Kodiya (Elephant flag)
 Gona bendi Kodiya (Bull flag)
 Makaraya bendi Kodiya (Makara flag)
 Thel Kodiya (Net flag)
 Matsaya Kodiya (Fish flag)
 Hanumantha Kodiya (Hanuma flag)
 Girava bendi Kodiya (Parrot flag)
(Perera 34, Kurukula Charitaya II 26)

See also
Timeline of the Karavas
Flag of Sri Lanka

References

Kurukula Charithaya part I 1968 Kurukula Vendar A. S. F. Weerasuriya

External links
 Karava web site - Kshatriya Maha Sabha Sri Lanka 
 The Ceylon Antiquary and literary Register, July 1921 
 Karava Flags 

Historical flags
Sinhalese castes